Galena Park High School is a secondary school located in Galena Park, Texas, United States and is one of three secondary schools in the Galena Park Independent School District (GPISD).

GPHS serves several areas: the city of Galena Park, the portion of Jacinto City south of Market Street, portions of Houston, and portions of unincorporated Harris County.

Origins

The school was originally known as Clinton High School but changed its name to Galena Park High School (GPHS) in 1928 when the town of Clinton, Texas became incorporated as Galena Park, named for the Galena Oil Company. It was assimilated into the Galena Park Independent School District (GPISD) in 1930. In 1970, GPISD closed the doors of Fidelity Manor High School and integrated the African-American population of that school into the ranks of GPHS and its feeder schools.

Campus
The school moved into its first permanent building in 1929 on the site of the current Galena Park Middle School (GPMS). That building became Galena Park Junior High until it was torn down to build the current GPMS. GPHS moved into its current location at 1000 Keene Street in Galena Park in March 1950. The 1,500-seat auditorium and the band and choir wings were added in 1953. A new wing on the north side of campus was built in 1956 adding a new gym and more classroom space. A new library was added in 1964 allowing for more classroom space and books. In 1994 a new library, front office, science wing and cafeteria were added during a major facelift of the school. During a 2004 construction the Arthur C. Lilly Center, the Johnnie Rountree Performing Arts Center and the new field house at Dement Field were all constructed and the entire school was given a facelift which included new dining areas and renovations in all three gymnasiums.

Principals
Billy Bob Backer was the first principal from 1928 until 1930. Mr. A. T. Johnson served as principal from 1930 until 1933. Mr. Don Slocomb became principal in 1933 and remained until 1952. From 1942-1945 Harold Dement was the acting principal while Mr. Slocomb served in the armed forces during World War II. Mr. John W. Hoke became the longest serving principal of GPHS, serving from 1952 until 1977. In 1977 Mr. Wayne Lucky became the principal and in 1986 the school was again remodeled adding space to the growing school. In 1990 Mr. Bill Burnett became the Principal of GPHS and remained until 1993, when George Banda took over those duties. In 1998, Mr. Arnold Ramirez became the Principal of GPHS and remained until 2000, when he moved into the GPISD administration. In 2000, GPHS ushered in the 21st Century with its first female principal, Mrs. Marsha Masi.  Mrs. Masi presided over another school remodeling. During the 2004 construction the Arthur C. Lilly Center, the Johnnie Rountree Fine Arts Center and the new field house at Dement Field were all constructed and the entire school was given a facelift which included new dining areas and renovations in all three gymnasiums. Mrs Masi implemented many new and innovative courses for the students of GPHS many of which offered student instruction in the career field of their choice.  Students could receive college credit while still in high school.  After 7 successful years for Mrs. Masi, Mr. Steven Kinney became principal for the 2007-2008 school year until he resigned due to illness in 2010 and was replaced by Tony Gardea, an alumnus of Galena Park High School. In 2018 Dr. Kimberly Martin, another alumnus, became the principal.

School Programs

The following programs are offered at GPHS:

Jacket Athletics
Baseball- 2003 & 2006 Varsity District Championship
Basketball
Football
Golf
Swimming
Soccer
Tennis
Track

Lady Jacket Athletics
Basketball
Bowling
Cross Country
Fútbol (Soccer)
Golf
Softball
Swim Team
Track
 Tennis
Volleyball

Band
The Band of Gold (Marching & Concert Band)

Choir
Treble Choir
Men's Choir
Concert Choir
Vocal Ensemble
Vasity Women's Choir
Varsity Men's Choir
Chorale

Career and Technology Programs
Auto Technology
BPA Business Professionals
Cosmetology
Criminal Justice
Culinary Arts
DECA
Electronics
FCCLA
FCCLA / HERO
HOSA Health Professions
National FFA Organization
National Technical Honor Society
Professional Communications
Robotics Team
TAFE (Future Teachers)
VICA Vocational/Industrial
Welding

Clubs
Academic Decathlon
Advisory Board
JROTC
Art Club
Athletic Trainers
Ballet Folklorico
Best Buddies
Cheerleading
Debate Team
Drawing Club
Drama & Thespian Society
FBLA (Future Business Leaders of America)
FCA / Youth For Christ
FFA- Future Farmers of America
Freestyle Crew (Dance)
Gents 1964
Madamoiselles
Geography Bee
Hi-Y & Sweethearts
Interact
International Club
Link Crew
LULAC
Mariachi Band
Math Honor Society
Mu Alpha Theta Fraternity
National Forensic League Speech and Debate Honor Society
National Honor Society
PALs Peer Assistance Leaders (deactivated-2008)
PRIDE Team
Quill & Scroll (Honor Society)
SADD
Science Club
Spanish Club
Speech and Debate Team
Student Council
Texas Future Music Educators
UIL Academic Teams

References

Galena Park High School Campus

External links
Galena Park High School

Galena Park Independent School District high schools
Public education in Houston
1928 establishments in Texas